Inez Courtney (October 12, 1897 – April 5, 1975) was an American actress on the Broadway stage and in films.

Early years
Born in Amsterdam, New York,  Courtney came from a large Irish-American family. After her father's death when she was fifteen, she decided to go onto the stage.

Career 
At age 16, Courtney was doing a specialty dance that earned her the nicknames of St Vitis, Mosquito and Lightning.

Courtney's first role as a singer and dancer came in the musical The Little Whopper in 1919. She became known among New York theatrical audiences for her work in Good News (1927), a musical comedy about college life. Her other credits include Spring Is Here (1929) and America's Sweetheart (1931). In the early 1930s, she left Broadway and went to Hollywood.

Courtney acted in 58 films between 1930 and 1940. She secured her first movie work by asking Harry Cohn of Columbia Pictures for his assistance. She made her screen debut as Cousin Betty in Loose Ankles (1930). Her movie credits include The Raven (1935), Suzy (1936), The Shop Around the Corner (1940), and Turnabout (1940), her last film.

Personal life and death 
On June 20, 1931, Courtney married broker Howard S. Paschal in Rye, New York. They were divorced on May 10, 1933. Courtney was married to an Italian nobleman, whereby she acquired the title Marchesa, but did not use it. On April 5, 1975, Courtney died at the Jersey Shore Medical Center in Neptune, New Jersey.

Partial filmography

Loose Ankles (1930) as Betty
Spring is Here (1930) as Mary Jane Braley
Not Damaged (1930) as Maude Graham
Song of the Flame (1930) as Grusha
Bright Lights (1930) as Peggy North
Sunny (1930) as 'Weenie'
The Hot Heiress (1931) as Margie
Big City Blues (1932) as Faun
The World Gone Mad (1933) as Susan Bibens, Telephone Operator (uncredited)
Cheating Blondes (1933) as Polly
Hold Your Man (1933) as Maizie
I Love That Man (1933) as Public Stenographer (scenes deleted)
The Captain Hates the Sea (1934) as Flo
Jealousy (1934) as Penny
Broadway Bill (1934) as Nurse Mae (uncredited)
Sweepstake Annie (1935) as Marge
Carnival (1935) as Girl (uncredited)
Men of the Hour (1935) as Miss Allison (uncredited)
Air Hawks (1935) as Second Nurse (uncredited)
Break of Hearts (1935) as Miss Wilson
Dizzy Dames (1935) as Arlette
The Raven (1935) as Mary Burns
The Affair of Susan (1935) as Mrs. Barnes
The Girl Friend (1935) as Hilda
Ship Cafe (1935) as Molly
Another Face (1935) as Mamie, Joe's Secretary (uncredited)
Millions in the Air (1935) as Miss Waterbury
Magnificent Obsession (1935) as Nurse May (uncredited)
 The Reckless Way (1936) as Laura Jones
Brilliant Marriage (1936) as Sally Patrick
Let's Sing Again (1936) as Marge Wilkins
Three Cheers for Love (1936) as Dorothy
Suzy (1936) as Maisie
It Couldn't Have Happened – But It Did (1936) as Linda Sands
Two in a Crowd (1936) as Mrs. Flynn (uncredited)
Wedding Present (1936) as Mary Lawson
Time Out for Romance (1937) as Mabel
Clarence (1937) as Della
The Hit Parade (1937) as Tillie
Armored Car (1937) as Blind Date
The 13th Man (1937) as Julie Walters
Partners in Crime (1937) as Lillian Tate
The Hurricane (1937) as Girl on Ship (uncredited)
Having Wonderful Time (1938) as Emma
Crime Ring (1938) as Kitty
Letter of Introduction (1938) as Woman at Barry's Party (uncredited)
Five of a Kind (1938) as Libby Long
Beauty for the Asking (1939) as Gwen Morrison
Blondie Meets the Boss (1939) as Betty Lou Wood
When Tomorrow Comes (1939) as Waitress (uncredited)
Missing Evidence (1939) as Nellie Conrad
The Shop Around the Corner (1940) as Ilona
The Farmer's Daughter (1940) as Emily French
Turnabout (1940) as Miss Edwards (final film role)

References

Bibliography
 Albert Lea, Minnesota Evening Tribune, Friday, August 10, 1936, Page 6.
 Oakland, California Tribune, Smile!-It Pays, Sunday, December 13, 1936. Page 72.
 Winnipeg, Manitoba Free Press, Saturday, May 17, 1930, Page 23.

External links

 
 

1897 births
1975 deaths
20th-century American actresses
American film actresses
American stage actresses
American people of Irish descent
Actresses from New York City